Phrynobatrachus hylaios is a species of frog in the family Phrynobatrachidae. It is known from southern Cameroon and western Republic of the Congo, although its range presumably extends into nearby Central African Republic, Equatorial Guinea, and Gabon. It was first described as a subspecies of Phrynobatrachus werneri. The common name Foulassi river frog has been coined for it.

Description
The body is slender. The snout is moderately pointed. The tympanum is poorly visible, measuring about half of the eye diameter. The finger and toe tips bear small discs. The toes are weakly webbed. Skin is smooth except for small warts on the lower back and the sides, and in males, verruca on the throat. Dorsal coloration is grey-brown.

Habitat and conservation
It is found in and around Raphia swamps, ditches, marshes, and small pools in forests, degraded secondary habitats, and gallery forests. Breeding takes place in still water. It is a very common and adaptable species that is not facing serious threats. It is probably present in several protected areas.

References

hylaios
Frogs of Africa
Amphibians of Cameroon
Amphibians of the Republic of the Congo
Amphibians described in 1959
Taxonomy articles created by Polbot
Taxa named by Jean-Luc Perret